The least groove-toothed swamp rat (Pelomys minor) is a species of rodent in the family Muridae.
It is found in Angola, Democratic Republic of the Congo, Tanzania, and Zambia.
Its natural habitat is moist savanna.

References

Pelomys
Mammals described in 1926
Taxonomy articles created by Polbot